Chiruromys is a genus of Old World mouse that is restricted to New Guinea and the nearby islands of Goodenough, Fergusson, and Normanby.

Characteristics
These are small arboreal rats with long tails. The fur is grey to brown above with a white belly. They are restricted to forests where they spend all of their time in the canopy. They live in groups usually consisting of a breeding pair and their offspring (usually one to three) (Nowak, 1999).

Classification
Musser and Carleton (2005) considered Chiruromys to be a member of the Pogonomys Division within the Murinae along with the genera Pogonomys, Hyomys, Macruromys, Mallomys, Coccymys, and Anisomys.  It is considered a New Guinea Old Endemic, part of the initial wave of murines colonizing the island.

Species
Genus Chiruromys
Greater tree mouse, Chiruromys forbesi
Lamia, Chiruromys lamia
Lesser tree mouse, Chiruromys vates

References

Musser, G. G. and M. D. Carleton. 2005. Superfamily Muroidea. pp. 894–1531 in Mammal Species of the World a Taxonomic and Geographic Reference. D. E. Wilson and D. M. Reeder eds. Johns Hopkins University Press, Baltimore.
Nowak, Ronald M. 1999. Walker's Mammals of the World, 6th edition. Johns Hopkins University Press, 1936 pp. 

 
Rodents of Papua New Guinea
Rodent genera
Taxa named by Oldfield Thomas
Endemic fauna of Papua New Guinea